Shazahn Padamsee is an Indian actress and model who primarily worked in Hindi films. Daughter of noted actors Alyque Padamsee and Sharon Prabhakar, she made her first film appearance in the 2009 Hindi film Rocket Singh: Salesman of the Year. After her début film, she went on to appear in two non-Hindi Indian films, gaining credit from critics for her performance, before featuring in Madhur Bhandarkar's Dil Toh Baccha Hai Ji in a prominent role.

Career
After appearances in several stage performances including her father's play Unspoken Dialogues, Shazahn Padamsee appeared in several national advertisements, whilst auditioning for roles in Hindi films. After a film with Vivek Vaswani failed to materialise, she successfully auditioned for the part in Yash Raj Films' Rocket Singh: Salesman of the Year opposite Ranbir Kapoor. Shazhan played Sherena in the film, the first customer who treats the titular character with respect during his job as a salesman. Although she played a leading female role, her screen-time was minimal leading to critics claiming that her role had little scope. The film opened to positive reviews, but the lack of publicity became a reason for it becoming a failure commercially at the box office.

Her second and third films were released on the same day, both being films in Tamil and Telugu respectively. In Kanimozhi, Shazahn played the role of Anu, a girl in the neighbourhood who the lead actor, played by Jai is nervous to express his feelings to. She had been approached after the director had looked through an online portfolio, and only signed after consent from her father. Upon release, the film gained mixed reviews with Shazahn's portrayal of her character being criticised. Critics claimed that she "looked pretty and was photographed well" but she could have "expressed more energy and expression" into her role, labelling her as a Barbie doll. However her Telugu film Orange garnered more positive reviews and Shazahn's portrayal of her role was better received by critics. Shazahn's character of Rooba, originally named after a song in the film, appeared in a flashback sequence as the girlfriend of the protagonist played by Ram Charan Teja. A critic said her performance was "a delight to watch" and that "Padamsee looks set for a long innings down South", whilst similar claims the critics from Sify and The Hindu claims that she "shines in her role" and that she "brings freshness to the screen".

Shazahn's first release of 2011 was the romantic comedy Dil Toh Baccha Hai Ji directed by Madhur Bhandarkar. The film portrayed her as June Pinto, an intern in an office whom an older divorced man, played by Ajay Devgn falls for. The film, which also featured Emraan Hashmi, Omi Vaidya, Shruti Haasan and Shraddha Das in other parallel roles, saw Shazahn indulge in heavy promotional work along with her co-stars. Shazahn's performance gaining mixed responses from critics with a reviewer citing that "looks like a doll and gets the character right" whilst another labelled hers as "the film's worst performance"; the film went on to become a commercial success at the box office. Shazahn's most recent release was Sajid Khan's Housefull 2, which featured her alongside an ensemble cast including Akshay Kumar, John Abraham, Zarine Khan, Asin and Jacqueline Fernandez. The film opened to mixed reviews with her role being described as "merely eye candy", but Housefull 2 went on to becoming the tenth film in history to cross  and became one of the biggest commercial successes of 2012. She is all set to play a Gujarati girl in her upcoming film Solid Patels. Her other project is "Disco Valley" directed by Sajit Warrier in which she will be appearing opposite Rajat Barmecha.

She is currently working on a live electronica project, SpanckMusic, with DJ Ankit "Ankytrixx" Kocher. She walked the ramp for Disha Vadgama (Fashion Designer) at Bombay Times Fashion Week 2022.

As of December 2022, Padamsee is shooting for Aryeman Ramsay's directional film, Dream Big. The shooting is taking place in California, USA.

In January 2023, Padamsee hosted the Sony WWE show, Super Dhamaal, alongside Sharman Joshi. She used her stage name "Sashaa Padamsee" for the first time.

Personal life
Her father, Alyque Padamsee was a veteran theater actor, who was born into a traditional Khoja Ismaili family from the Kutch region of Gujarat.

Filmography

Films

TV Shows

See also

 List of Indian film actresses

References

External links
 
 

Living people
1987 births
21st-century Indian actresses
Indian film actresses
Actresses in Hindi cinema
Actresses in Tamil cinema
Actresses in Telugu cinema
Indian female models
Indian Ismailis
Gujarati people
Khoja Ismailism